Peloncillo refers to:

Peloncillo National Forest, formerly of southeast Arizona, bordering New Mexico
Peloncillo Mountains (Cochise County), in northeast Cochise County, Arizona
Peloncillo Mountains (Hidalgo County), in southwest Hidalgo County, New Mexico